Man Met, or Kemie ( Kemiehua), is a poorly classified Austroasiatic language spoken by about 1,000 people in Jinghong County, Xishuangbanna, China. It is classified as an Angkuic language by Paul Sidwell (2010). It may be or Mangic according to Li Yunbing (2005), or Palaungic. Like most other Austroasiatic languages, Kemie has subject–verb–object (SVO) word order.

Distribution
Kemie is spoken in the following villages by just over 1,000 people.
Jinghong Township (景洪镇)
Xiaomanmi (小曼咪村, 58 households, 256 persons)
Damanmi (大曼咪村, 53 households, 234 persons)
Jiangtou Manmi (江头曼咪村, 33 households, 124 persons)
Manmi (曼咪村, man13 met53) of Gadong Township (嘎东乡, 51 households, 228 persons)
Sanjia (三家村) of Mengyang Township (勐养镇, 46 households, 200 persons)

References

Further reading

External links 
 http://projekt.ht.lu.se/rwaai RWAAI (Repository and Workspace for Austroasiatic Intangible Heritage)
 http://hdl.handle.net/10050/00-0000-0000-0003-93F9-9@view Man Met in RWAAI Digital Archive

Palaungic languages